Mind the Gap is the third (and last) album by Canadian indie rock group Tristan Psionic. It was released in 2000 on Sonic Unyon, a record label started by three members of the band.

The album was produced by Ian Blurton and engineered by Dale Morningstar at The Gas Station in Toronto. It ranked as the number two album of 2000 for Canadian college radio.

Track listing 
All songs written by Tristan Psionic (Rob Higgins / Sandy McIntosh / Mark Milne / Tim Potocic) except where noted.
 "Promise" – 10:39
 "Helicopter" (Tristan Psionic / April Sabucco) – 2:50
 "Launch" (Tristan Psionic / Sabucco) – 3:32
 "Mimico" – 1:10
 "Red Dots" – 2:44
 "High Time" – 3:03
 "Longbranch" – 1:13
 "Signs" – 3:09
 "The Move Is Set" (Tristan Psionic / Sabucco) – 2:13
 "Sunshinin'" – 2:56
 "Just Off the Level" (Tristan Psionic / Sabucco) – 3:25
 "Union Station" – 3:23
 "Camp Morningstar" (Tristan Psionic / Sabucco) – 2:08
 "Can't Wait Forever" – 4:56

Tristan Psionic albums
2000 albums